Haiti competed at the 1928 Summer Olympics in Amsterdam, Netherlands. The country's delegation consisted of two track and field athletes, V.A. Theard and Silvio Cator. Cator took second place in the long jump, winning Haiti's first silver medal and the second medal for Haiti of any type.

Medalists

Athletics

Key
Note–Ranks given for track events are within the athlete's heat only
Q = Qualified for the next round
q = Qualified for the next round as a fastest loser or, in field events, by position without achieving the qualifying target
NR = National record
N/A = Round not applicable for the event
Bye = Athlete not required to compete in round
NP = Not placed

Men
Track & road events

Men
Field Events

References
 International Olympic Committee results database

Nations at the 1928 Summer Olympics
1928
Summer Olympics